Datum is an Austrian magazine of reportage, political and cultural features and analysis, essays and criticism. It is published and edited in Vienna.

Started in 2004, the magazine is now published ten times annually. Although its stories focus on the political and cultural life of Austria, Datum has a significant audience outside of the country. Throughout the German-language-countries it is well known for its journalism on political, cultural and social issues, its illustrations, its rigorous fact checking and copyediting and its cosmopolitan sophistication.

History
Datum debuted in March 2004. It was founded by author and journalist Klaus Stimeder (aka JM Stim) and Hannes Weyringer, a businessman and financial consultant. Stimeder wanted to create a sophisticated monthly based on the editorial concepts of The New Yorker, German weekly Die Zeit and the weekend supplement of the Süddeutsche Zeitung, providing long articles with background information on contemporary and historical topics. The magazine's first office was based in Stimeder's apartment in a public housing project in Vienna. Regardless of the early, occasionally precarious years of its existence, it soon established itself as a pre-eminent forum for non-fiction writing and serious journalism.

In subsequent years the magazine published features, essays and commentaries by many of the most respected (and sometimes controversial) contemporary Austrian writers, journalists, artists, politicians, sportsmen and scientists, including Karl Markovics, Wolf D. Prix, Johannes Hahn, Kurt Waldheim, Anton Zeilinger, Alfred Dorfer, Ursula Plassnik, Bernhard Lang, Louie Austen, Oliver Welter, Ursula Stenzel, Alfred Gusenbauer, Deborah Sengl, Peter Noever, Markus Kupferblum, Barbara Prammer, Toni Innauer, Toni Innauer, Lothar Höbelt or Andreas Khol.

Notable permanent contributors include philosopher Franz Schuh, Viennese actionist painter Günter Brus, Philip Köster, founder and editor of soccer magazine 11 Freunde, and Michael Frank, the long-time Vienna and Prague correspondent of Süddeutsche Zeitung, who from 2005 to 2014 Frank curated a section named “Alte Texte” (“Old Texts”) under which the magazine re-published popular, but mostly less known pieces by classic authors like Kurt Tucholsky, Stefan Zweig or Heinrich Böll.

Since its debut the magazine has been awarded with numerous international and domestic awards for its design and for its content. In September 2005, Tyler Brûlé awarded Datum with a "Fast Lane Media Award" in the "Best International News Magazine". In his column in the Financial Times he stated: "Austria's Datum is showing others how it should be done. With its slightly off, always iconic covers, matte paper stock and sharp lay-outs it's become a cult favourite among art directors around the world. The website's a thing of beauty, too."

In 2007 Stimeder published the “Datum Code of Ethics”, making the magazine the first privately owned medium in Austrian media history to have one. In 2009 DATUM was named one of the "100 Most Innovative Magazines in the World" by members of a jury of Luxembourg-based magazine symposium "Colophon".

From 2007 to 2009 the magazine co-operated with Vienna's Rabenhof Theater in co-hosting a series of literary events called "DATUM presents”. The series brought an array of acclaimed international writers to Austria's capital, notably Chuck Palahniuk, Ian Rankin, Sven Regener, Juli Zeh, FM Einheit, Manuel Andrack, Thomas Brussig, and Robert Menasse.

In its early years, the magazine started to sometimes publish three or for stories a month online, but in recent years has increased its online output significantly, mostly by adding blogs. In August 2008 Austrian trade magazine “Der Journalist” (“The Journalist”) called Datum “The Best School for Young Writers in the Country".

Stimeder edited the magazine until 2009 and stayed on as publisher until 2010.

Change of ownership 
In 2010, Stimeder sold his shares in Datum to his partner Weyringer who subsequently sold a minority of shares to Stefan Kaltenbrunner, a journalist and corporate publishing consultant who had started working for the magazine in 2008 and succeeded Stimeder as editor a year later. Starting in 2013 publishing company Medecco acquired 100 percent of Datum'''s shares. In February 2016 medecco announced an asset deal with Stefan Apfl, an award-winning journalist who had been among the first generation of journalists to work for the magazine. Apfl acquired the title copyright for Datum as well as the magazine's subscriber database. He had previously succeeded Kaltenbrunner as editor in late 2015.

ReadershipDatum is read nationwide, with 84 percent of its circulation in Austria's metropolitan areas (municipalities above 5.000 people). According to a survey conducted by Peter Hajek Public Opinion Strategies in 2008, the vast majority of readers is between 20 and 39 years of age. The average household income of Datum'' readers in 2008 ranged between at least 1.800 Euros to more than 3.000 Euros (the average income in Austria in 2008 was 2.088 Euros). 58 percent of its readers have at least one college degree, while 34 percent have a High School Diploma.

See also
List of magazines in Austria

References

External links
  

 

2004 establishments in Austria
German-language magazines
Magazines established in 2004
Magazines published in Vienna
Monthly magazines published in Austria
News magazines published in Europe
Political magazines
Ten times annually magazines